David Falconer Hewat (23 January 1866 – 2 February 1959) was a New Zealand cricketer who played four matches of first-class cricket for Wellington between 1887 and 1890.

Hewat was a fast bowler. His best figures were 7 for 30 against Hawke's Bay in 1887–88. Earlier in the same season, on his first-class debut, he had taken 6 for 25, bowling unchanged through the innings, against Nelson.

References

External links
 
 David Hewat at CricketArchive

1866 births
1959 deaths
New Zealand cricketers
Wellington cricketers